Miriam Kantorková (born 13 March 1935, in Prague) is a Czech actress. She starred in the 1970 film Witchhammer under director Otakar Vávra.

Selected filmography
 První parta (1959)
 Romance for Bugle (1967)
 Witchhammer (1970)

References

External links

Czech film actresses
1935 births
Living people
Actresses from Prague
Czech television actresses
Academy of Performing Arts in Prague alumni
Czech voice actresses
20th-century Czech actresses
21st-century Czech actresses